Phaeobacterium is a Gram-negative, rod-shaped, phototrophic and motile genus of bacteria from the family of Chromatiaceae with one known species (Phaeobacterium nitratireducens).

References

Chromatiales
Bacteria genera
Monotypic bacteria genera
Taxa described in 2015